Catherine Beatrice Margaret Derham (born 18 June 1970) is a British newscaster and a presenter on television and radio.

Early life and education
Derham was born on 18 June 1970 in Canterbury, Kent to Margaret, a teacher, and John Derham, a chemist for Pfizer. The family moved to Cheshire within a year of her birth, and she grew up in Wilmslow. She was educated at a primary school in Sandbach and at Cheadle Hulme School where she took A-Levels in French, History and Economics. She then read economics at Magdalene College, Cambridge, graduating with a BA (Hons).

Broadcasting career

BBC (1995–98)
Derham began her broadcasting career at the BBC, starting as a researcher on Radio 4's Money Box. In 1995 she won the Bradford & Bingley "Best Personal Finance Broadcaster Award" for her work as a presenter on Radio 5 Live's Moneycheck. She moved to BBC television in 1996 as a consumer affairs correspondent and was also a reporter on the long-running Film... programme.

ITN (1998–2010)
In 1998 she joined ITN as the Media and Arts Editor for ITV News and, at the age of 27, became the youngest newscaster on British national television since ITN's creation in 1955. In 2004, Derham became the main female presenter of the ITV Lunchtime News, and a relief presenter for both the ITV Evening News and the ITV News at Ten. She also co-presented the ITV London news programme London Tonight. Derham hosted her final ITV News programme on 25 June 2010.

BBC (2010 onwards)
In April 2010 it was announced that Derham was to return to the BBC. Derham has an arts brief, including fronting the coverage of the Proms for BBC Two, BBC Four and BBC Radio 3.

Derham is a presenter of Radio 3's Afternoon on 3 and Breakfast programmes, having previously presented the Hall of Fame Concert on Classic FM. In 2008 she presented the Traveller's Tree series on Radio 4. Derham also makes an occasional guest presenter appearance on Saturday Live.

In August 2015 the BBC announced that Derham would appear in the thirteenth series of Strictly Come Dancing. Her partner was Anton Du Beke. In week 4, the couple finished top of the leader board. In weeks 9 and 11 they performed their best dances, both earning 35 out of a possible 40. In the semi-final they finished last in both dances and were in the dance-off with Anita Rani and Gleb Savchenko; the judges voted them through to compete in the final (the first time Anton had done so) where they finished in fourth place. In 2017, she returned for the Christmas Special and was partnered with Brendan Cole: the couple won the event.

In August 2016 Derham presented The Girl from Ipanema, a documentary for BBC Four. In September 2017, she presented coverage of the Last Night of the Proms on BBC Two and BBC One.

Since 2017, Derham has been a presenter on In Tune on BBC Radio 3.

Other work
Derham hosted the Classical BRIT Awards ceremony four times from 2001 to 2004. In August 2008 she appeared in the BBC Two talent programme Maestro, where she learnt to conduct orchestral, choral and operatic music; and, in 2010, in the factual entertainment programme First Love, where she returned to the violin playing of her youth.

In 2015, Derham partnered with BAFTA-nominated producer Jane Gerber to found Peanut & Crumb, a Brighton-based multiplatform studio that produces branded content, podcasts and broadcast programmes.

Personal life
Derham plays the violin. She married restaurateur John Vincent in 1999; he had proposed on the night they met. They have two daughters and live in Horsted Keynes, near Haywards Heath, Sussex.

References

External links

In Tune (BBC Radio 3)
Katie Derham at Noel Gay
Katie Derham at Radio 3

1970 births
Alumni of Magdalene College, Cambridge
BBC Radio 3 presenters
English journalists
English radio presenters
English television presenters
ITN newsreaders and journalists
Living people
People educated at Cheadle Hulme School
People from Canterbury